Kendry Flores (born November 24, 1991) is a Dominican former professional baseball pitcher. He previously played in Major League Baseball (MLB) for the Miami Marlins.

Career

San Francisco Giants
Flores was originally signed by the San Francisco Giants as an international free agent in 2009. He was added to the 40-man roster on November 20, 2013.

Miami Marlins
On December 19, 2014, Flores and Luis Castillo were traded to the Miami Marlins for Casey McGehee. He was recalled to Miami on June 2, 2015 from the Jacksonville Suns.

St. Louis Cardinals
On November 18, 2016, Flores signed a minor league deal with the St. Louis Cardinals that included an invitation to spring training. On February 16, 2017, the contract was voided after Flores failed his physical. This made him a free agent.

References

External links

1991 births
Living people
Arizona League Giants players
Augusta GreenJackets players
Dominican Republic expatriate baseball players in the United States
Dominican Summer League Giants players
Jacksonville Suns players
Jupiter Hammerheads players

Major League Baseball players from the Dominican Republic
Major League Baseball pitchers
New Orleans Zephyrs players
Miami Marlins players
Salem-Keizer Volcanoes players
San Jose Giants players